John Hackett (born 13 March 1955) is a British musician, the younger brother of guitarist Steve Hackett. Although his primary instrument is the flute, he also plays guitar, bass, bass pedals and keyboards.

Early career
Hackett had both classical and rock music backgrounds. His early career was mostly as part of his brother's band, appearing on many early albums and touring until 1983. By then, he had already made guest contributions to other albums, such as Anthony Phillips's debut solo album The Geese and the Ghost.

He has as played with ensembles such as The English Flute Quartet and the Westminster Camerata, and as a founder-member of the relaxation and ambient music group, Symbiosis. He has also maintained a strong output from session work with a variety of artists and projects.

Solo work
From 2004, John has been regularly releasing solo albums, taking in classical, folk, and rock stylings.
In 2005, Checking Out of London was released, a rock album produced with Nick Magnus, and with the majority of the lyrics by Nick Clabburn. This was followed up in 2015 with a second rock album, Another Life, also with the involvement of Magnus and Clabburn.

With Nick Magnus
Since being in Steve Hackett's band together, John and Nick Magnus have often collaborated, recording and performing together many times.

With Marco Lo Muscio
John has worked alongside Italian organist Marco Lo Muscio throughout the 2000s, often performing organ/piano/flute duets in live performances across Europe (UK, Italy, Germany, Poland, France). There are few recordings of them together, though Hackett played on Lo Muscio's The Book of Bilbo and Gandalf album, and they collaborated on the Playing The History project with Steve Hackett.
In 2019 they published the first official album in DUO, On the Wings of the Wind, with Stradivarius.

With Nick Fletcher
Since 2012, John has collaborated with Classical guitarist Nick Fletcher. They have performed as a flute/guitar duo across England and recorded two albums of instrumental music, the first of which also featured Steve Hackett.

John Hackett Band
In 2005, a short lived band existed to promote Checking Out of London, featuring Nick Magnus on keyboards and Tony Patterson on vocals, along with various members of the Genesis tribute band, ReGenesis.

To support the release of Another Life, a trio was formed with John (guitars, keys, vocals), Nick Fletcher (lead guitar) and Duncan Parsons (percussion, vocals), which was soon expanded to a full band with the addition of Jeremy Richardson (bass, guitars, vocals) and Duncan moving to full drum kit.

The band started public performances as the John Hackett Band in 2016, their debut album We Are Not Alone was released in 2017 through Esoteric Antenna Records as a double CD set of a studio album and a live album recorded in 2016.

Discography

Solo releases
 2004 – Velvet Afternoon – for Flute and Piano 
 2005 – Checking Out of London 
 2006 – Red Planet Rhythm 
 2011 – Moonspinner – for Flute and Guitar
 2013 – Overnight Snow – for Flute and Guitar
 2015 – Another Life
 2016 – Hills of Andalucia, with Nick Fletcher
 2016 – Beyond the Stars, with Nick Fletcher
 2020 – The Piper Plays His Tune

John Hackett and Steve Hackett 
 2000 – Sketches of Satie

John Hackett With Steve Hackett and Chris Glassfield 
 2008 : Prelude To Summer For Flute & Guitar

John Hackett and Nick Magnus 
 2011 – Live 2010 (John Hackett & Nick Magnus, Magick Nuns Records MNCD1003)

John Hackett Band
 2017 – We Are Not Alone

with Steve Hackett
 1975 – Voyage of the Acolyte 
 1978 – Please Don't Touch 
 1979 – Spectral Mornings 
 1980 – Defector 
 1981 – Cured 
 1983 – Bay of Kings 
 1988 – Momentum 
 1992 – Time Lapse (live)
 1992 – The Unauthorised Biography 
 1996 – Watcher of the Skies: Genesis Revisited 
 1997 – A Midsummer Night's Dream 
 1998 – Darktown 
 2001 – Live Archive 
 2002 – Guitare Classique 
 2002 – Hungarian Horizons (DVD)
 2003 – To Watch the Storms 
 2005 – Metamorpheus 
 2006 – Wild Orchids 
 2009 – Out of the Tunnel's Mouth 
 2011 – Beyond the Shrouded Horizon 
 2012 – Genesis Revisited II
 2014 – Access All Areas
 2017 – The Night Siren
 2018 – Wuthering Nights (live)

With others
 1970 – The Road (Quiet World) – With Steve Hackett, Dik Driver, etc.
 1977 – The Geese and the Ghost (Anthony Phillips) – With Mike Rutherford & Phil Collins.
 1979 – Sides (Anthony Phillips) 
 1988 – Tears of the Moon (Symbiosis; reissued on CD, 2001)
 1988 – The Song of the Peach Tree Spring (Symbiosis)
 1991 – Mirage And Reality (Mae McKenna)
 1992 – Touching the Clouds (Symbiosis)
 1994 – Lake of Dreams (Symbiosis)
 1995 – Autumn Days (Symbiosis)
 1996 – Amber and Jade (Symbiosis)
 1999 – Inhaling Green (Nick Magnus)
 1999 – Sea of Light (Symbiosis)
 2002 – The Comfort Zone (Symbiosis)
 2004 – Battle of the Birds: A Celtic Tale (Anthony Phillips & Harry Williamson With Didier Malherbe Narrated By Gilli Smyth)
 2004 – Hexameron (Nick Magnus)
 2005 – Dancing in Your Dreams (Symbiosis)
 2009 – JL (Algebra)
 2010 – The Book of Bilbo and Gandalf (Marco Lo Muscio)
 2010 – Children of Another God (Nick Magnus)
 2011 – Oddity (Franck Carducci)
 2012 – "The Rome Pro(G)ject feat. Steve Hackett and John Hackett" cd single – (TRP Records)
 2012 – "The Rome Pro(G)ject (feat. Steve and John Hackett Nick Magnus David Cross, David Jackson, Richard Sinclair, Francesco Di Giacomo, Vincenzo Ricca and others) – (TRP Records)
 2012 – Abandoned Buildings (Duncan Parsons)
 2013 – Playing the History – for Flute, Organ, Piano, Bass, Guitar & Saxophone, with Marco Lo Muscio, Steve Hackett, Carlo Matteucci, David Jackson, & Giorgio Gabriel
 2014 – C:Ore (Duncan Parsons)
 2014 – Odysseas (Syndone)
 2015 – Les Chateaux De La Loire (Ellesmere)
 2017 – "Joyce Choice" in the cd "Winter Tales" by Giorgio Coslovich
 2017 – Air & Grace – Relaxing Music for Flute with Symbiosis (Compilation)
 2019 – "On the Wings of the Wind" by John Hackett and Marco Lo Muscio
 2020 – Wyrd'' (Ellesmere)

References

 John Hackett With Steve Hackett & Chris Glassfield : https://www.discogs.com/fr/John-Hackett-With-Steve-Hackett-Chris-Glassfield-Prelude-To-Summer-For-Flute-Guitar/release/4635391
 Steve Hackett – Access All Areas : https://www.discogs.com/fr/Steve-Hackett-Access-All-Areas/release/6735855

External links
Official website
Symbiosis

Living people
British flautists
New-age musicians
1955 births